The Darlington Memorial Fountain is a gilded bronze statue by C. Paul Jennewein. It is located at Judiciary Park at 5th Street and D Street, Northwest, Washington, D.C., in the Judiciary Square neighborhood.

Background 

The Darlington Memorial Fountain was named after Joseph J. Darlington. Born in 1849, Darlington came to Washington as a young man to attend law school. He then gained an office on Fifth Street, and was known as the leader of the legal community. Darlington worked on Fifth Street for the remainder of his career.

Shortly after his death, friends and colleagues proposed to have a memorial built in his honor. A committee was formed under Frank J. Hogan to further the cause. After Congress passed a resolution in favor of the memorial, the committee passed its design selection responsibilities to the United States Commission of Fine Arts.

Design 

The design by C. Paul Jennewein was approved by the United States Commission of Fine Arts, in 1921.

It was installed in November 1923. There was some controversy about the nymph, both for its nudity and its lack of reference to Darlington.

Inscription 

The inscription reads:
 On top of bronze base
 A. Kunst
 Bronze Foundry N.Y.
 C.P. Jennewein
 SC. 1922

On side of bronze base
C.P. Jennewein
SC. 1922

On side of marble base
This monument has been erected by his friends with the
sanction of Congress in memory of Joseph James Darlington
1849–1920
counselor teacher lover of mankind

Awards 

The sculpture was awarded the 1926 Fairmount Park Association Prize from the Pennsylvania Academy of the Fine Arts. Another example was acquired by Brookgreen Gardens in 1940, from Charles Louis Borie, friend of the sculptor.

See also
 List of public art in Washington, D.C., Ward 6

References 

Nude figure as memorial brings severe criticism Library of Congress Prints and Photographs Division
http://dcmemorialist.com/j-j-darlington/

1922 sculptures
Bronze sculptures in Washington, D.C.
Fountains in Washington, D.C.
Judiciary Square
Nude sculptures in Washington, D.C.
Outdoor sculptures in Washington, D.C.
1922 establishments in Washington, D.C.
Deer in art